Mixed Match is a 2016 animated/live-action documentary film directed by Canadian director Jeff Chiba Stearns. The documentary explores the challenges multi-ethnic blood disease patients face when trying to find a bone marrow match for transplant.

Awards and nominations

Awards
2016 Audience Choice Award, Best Overall Feature: 20th Toronto Reel Asian International Film Festival
2016 National Bank People's Choice Award, Best Overall Feature: 20th Vancouver Asian Film Festival
2016 Runner-up - Audience Award: 17th San Diego Asian Film Festival 
2017 Best of the Northwest Feature Award: 19th Spokane International Film Festival
2017 Audience Award - Documentary: 35th CAAMFest
2017 Audience Award – North American Documentary Feature: 33rd Los Angeles Asian Pacific Film Festival  
2017 Grand Jury Award - Best Documentary Feature Film: 13th Houston Asian American Pacific Islander Film Festival
2017 Audience Award – Documentary & Special Jury Mention: 13th 16th Asian American Film Festival of Dallas
2017 Audience Award – Documentary Feature: 10th Austin Asian American Film Festival

Nominations
2017 Nominated for Best Feature Length Documentary: Leo Awards 2011 
2017 Nominated for Best Screenwriting in a Feature Length Documentary: Leo Awards 2017  
2017 Nominated for Best Picture Editing in a Feature Length Documentary: Leo Awards 2017 
2017 Nominated for Best Sound in a Feature Length Documentary: Leo Awards 2017
2017 Nominated for Best Cinematography in a Feature Length Documentary: Leo Awards 2017
2017 Nominated for Best Direction in a Feature Length Documentary: Leo Awards 2017

References

External links 
 

2016 animated films
2016 films
2016 documentary films
Canadian animated documentary films
Documentary films about race and ethnicity
2010s English-language films
2010s Canadian films